A substitution table is used while teaching structures of English to students. H.E. Palmer defines a substitution table as "a process by which any model sentence may be multiplied indefinitely by substituting for any of its words or word-groups, including others of the same grammatical family and within certain semantic limits".

Procedure for preparation 
Language components to be taught must be used in a grammatically correct model sentence. Simple structures or language components must be the ones taught in initial stages, with only one item covered at a time. A word, phrase, idiom, or vocabulary item may be used as a tool. The words of a model sentence are substituted for by other words. The substitution words are of the same grammatical family in which the model sentence is drawn. The components (structure/words) must be simple so that the pupil can easily understand them.

Types of Substitution tables 
 Simple Substitution Table
 Compound Substitution Table
 Grammatical Substitution Table
 Perfect Substitution Table
 Imperfect Substitution table

English grammar